Hampsthwaite railway station served the village of Hampsthwaite, North Yorkshire, England from 1866 to 1950 on the Nidd Valley Railway.

History 
The station was opened on 1 July 1866 by the North Eastern Railway. Tenders for its construction were invited in 1864 after authorisation in August of that year; despite being an attractive design by Thomas Prosser, the NER Architect, it was not like his characteristic stepped-gable stone stations at Ripley, Birstwith, Dacre and Pateley Bridge. There were never any freight facilities at Hampsthwaite, local goods traffic being handled at Birstwith or Ripley. The station was closed to both passengers and parcels traffic on 2 January 1950; the line closed to passengers in April 1951.

The station building remains and has been converted to residential use.

References

External links 

Disused railway stations in North Yorkshire
Former North Eastern Railway (UK) stations
Railway stations closed in 1950
Railway stations opened in 1866
Railway stations in Great Britain opened in the 19th century